Leirvík is a town on the Faroe Islands and was an important regional ferry harbour at the east coast of the second-largest island Eysturoy. Leirvík has a population of 1,030 (2022).

It was the only town in the municipality of Leirvík (Leirvíkar kommuna), however on 1 January 2009, it merged with Gøtu kommuna to make the new municipality called Eysturkommuna.

Leirvík is important for its fishing industry.

The Norðoyatunnilin, a submarine tunnel to Klaksvík to the east, was opened in April 2006.

A district heating system pulls heat from the sea, increases the heat in a heat pump powered by electricity, and sends the heat to the large buildings in the town.

History 
Archaeological excavations have shown that the town was first settled the 9th century by the Vikings. It is said that all inhabitants died in 1349 because of the Black Death.

See also

 Leirvik in Norway
 Lerwick in the Shetland Islands
 List of towns in the Faroe Islands

References

External links 

 Faroeislands.dk: Leirvík

Populated places established in the 9th century
Populated places in the Faroe Islands